USS Crawford may refer to:

, a United States Navy minesweeper and tug in commission from 1917 to 1919

Fictional ships
USS Crawford (SSN-806), a fictional United States Navy submarine in the NCIS/JAG television universe

United States Navy ship names